ID.Entity is the eighth studio album by Polish-progressive rock band Riverside, it was released on January 20, 2023 by Inside Out Music and Mystic Production and was produced by bassist Mariusz Duda. The album peaked at #2 in Poland and #4 in Germany. It is the first album to feature lead guitarist Maciej Meller, who had replaced Piotr Grudziński  following his death in 2017 as a touring member, he would later join the band as a full member in 2020. The cover was created by Polish artist Jarek Kubicki. The first single "I'm Done With You", was released on October 21, 2022 along with a music video. The tracks "Self-Aware" and "Friend or Foe?" would be released as singles in November and January respectively.

Track listing 

Bonus Tracks

Charts

References 

Riverside (band) albums
2023 albums